Jimmie Baillie was a Canadian soccer player who spent most of his career in Montreal, and played one season in the American Soccer League.

Club career
Baillie played for both CNR and Carsteel in Montreal.  In 1930, he spent one season with the New York Soccer Club of the American Soccer League.

International
On June 11, 1926, Baillie earned a cap with the Canada in a 6–2 loss to the United States.

References

External links
 
 
 

Canadian soccer players
American Soccer League (1921–1933) players
Canadian expatriate soccer players
Canadian expatriate sportspeople in the United States
Canada men's international soccer players
Expatriate soccer players in the United States
Montreal Carsteel players
New York Soccer Club players
Association football forwards
Year of birth missing